Pogonomyrmex anergismus is a species of ant in the subfamily Myrmicinae. It is native to the United States.

References

External links

anergismus
Insects of the United States
Hymenoptera of North America
Insects described in 1954
Taxonomy articles created by Polbot
Slave-making ants